The 2021–22 Thai FA Cup is the 28th season of a Thailand's knockout football competition. The tournament was sponsored by Chang, and known as the Chang FA Cup for sponsorship purposes. The tournament is organized by the Football Association of Thailand. 94 clubs were accepted into the tournament, and it began with the qualification round on 29 September 2021 and concluded with the final on 22 May 2022. The winner would have qualified for the 2023 AFC Champions League play-off and the 2022 Thailand Champions Cup.

Calendar

Results
Note: T1: Clubs from Thai League 1; T2: Clubs from Thai League 2; T3: Clubs from Thai League 3; TA: Clubs from Thailand Amateur League.

Qualification round
There were 13 clubs from 2021–22 Thai League 2, 28 clubs from 2021–22 Thai League 3, and 19 clubs from Thailand Amateur League have signed to qualifying in 2021–22 Thai FA cup. This round had drawn on 10 September 2021. There are 113 goals that occurred in this round.

First round
The first round would be featured 30 clubs that were the winners of the qualification round including 10 clubs from T2, 15 clubs from T3, and 5 clubs from TA and the new entries including 16 clubs from 2021–22 Thai League 1, 3 clubs from 2021–22 Thai League 2, 7 clubs from 2021–22 Thai League 3, and 8 clubs from Thailand Amateur League. This round had drawn on 1 October 2021. There are 155 goals that occurred in this round.

Second round
The second round would be featured 32 clubs that were the winners of the first round including 15 clubs from T1, 3 clubs from T2, 13 clubs from T3, and 1 club from TA. This round had drawn on 1 November 2021. There are 69 goals that occurred in this round.

Third round
The third round would be featured 16 clubs that were the winners of the second round including 12 clubs from T1, 2 clubs from T2, and 2 clubs from T3. This round had drawn on 14 December 2021. There are 22 goals that occurred in this round.

Quarter-finals
The quarter-finals would be featured 8 clubs that were the winners of the third round including 6 clubs from T1 and 2 clubs from T3. This round had drawn on 25 January 2022. There are 8 goals that occurred in this round.

Semi-finals
The semi-finals would be featured 4 clubs that were the winners of the quarter-finals, all are clubs from T1. This round had drawn on 21 April 2022. There are 8 goals that occurred in this round.

Final

The final would be featured 2 clubs that were the winners of the semi-finals, both are clubs from T1. There is 1 goal that occurred in this round.

Tournament statistics

Top goalscorers

Hat-tricks

Notes: 5 = Player scored 5 goals; 4 = Player scored 4 goals; (H) = Home team; (A) = Away team

See also
 2021–22 Thai League 1
 2021–22 Thai League 2
 2021–22 Thai League 3
 2021–22 Thai League 3 Northern Region
 2021–22 Thai League 3 Northeastern Region
 2021–22 Thai League 3 Eastern Region
 2021–22 Thai League 3 Western Region
 2021–22 Thai League 3 Southern Region
 2021–22 Thai League 3 Bangkok Metropolitan Region
 2021–22 Thai League 3 National Championship
 2021–22 Thai League Cup
 2021 Thailand Champions Cup

References

External links
Thai League official website
Thai FA Cup official Facebook page

2021 in Thai football cups
Thailand FA Cup
Thailand FA Cup
Thai FA Cup seasons